The 2014 Division 2, part of the 2014 Swedish football season, was the 9th season of Sweden's fourth-tier football league in its current format. The season started on 12 April 2014 and ended on 11 October 2014. The teams promoted to Division 1 were: Piteå IF, Akropolis IF, Södertälje FK, Carlstad United BK, FC Höllviken, and Eskilsminne IF.

Teams

Division 2 Norrland
Anundsjö IF
Bodens BK FF
Hudiksvalls FF 
Härnösands FF
IFK Östersund
Mariehem SK
Morön BK
Piteå IF
Sandvikens IF
Sandviks IK
Selånger FK
Söderhamns FF
Tegs SK
Ånge IF
Source - Results & League Table 2014: svenskfotboll.se

Division 2 Norra Svealand
Akropolis IF
BKV Norrtälje
Gamla Upsala SK
IFK Aspudden-Tellus
Karlbergs BK
Konyaspor KIF
Kvarnsvedens IK
Skiljebo SK
Sollentuna FF
Spårvägens FF
Strömsbergs IF
Syrianska IF Kerburan
Värmdö IF
Västerås IK
Source – Results & League Table 2014:  svenskfotboll.se

Division 2 Södra Svealand
Arameisk-Syrianska IF
Ekerö IK
Enskede IK
Eskilstuna Södra FF
FC Gute
FC Linköping City
IK Sleipner
Karlslunds IF HFK
KB Karlskoga FF
Nacka FF
Rynninge IK
Smedby AIS
Södertälje FK
Värmbols FC
Source – Results & League Table 2014:  svenskfotboll.se

Division 2 Norra Götaland
Carlstad United BK
Grebbestads IF
IFK Åmål
IFK Ölme
IK Gauthiod
Karlstad BK
Lerums IS
Lidköpings FK
Lärje-Angereds IF
Nordvärmland FF
Stenungsunds IF
Tibro AIK FK
Torslanda IK
Ytterby IS
Source – Results & League Table 2014:  svenskfotboll.se

Division 2 Östra Götaland
Asarums IF FK
BW 90 IF
FC Höllviken
FC Rosengård 1917
FK Karlskrona
Hässleholms IF
IF Limhamn Bunkeflo
IFK Berga
KSF Prespa Birlik
Kvarnby IK
Lindsdals IF
Ljungby IF
Nosaby IF
Vimmerby IF
Source – Results & League Table 2014: svenskfotboll.se

Division 2 Västra Götaland
Assyriska BK
Dalstorps IF
Eskilsminne IF
GIF Nike
Helsingborgs IF Akademi
Högaborgs BK
Höganäs BK
Jonsereds IF
Lindome GIF
Råslätts SK
Sävedalens IF
Tenhults IF
Torns IF
Tvååkers IF
Source – Results & League Table 2014:  svenskfotboll.se

League tables

Division 2 Norrland

Division 2 Norra Svealand

Division 2 Södra Svealand

Division 2 Norra Götaland

Division 2 Östra Götaland

Division 2 Västra Götaland

Relegation play-offs

First round
The first legs were played on 8 October, and the second legs were played on 11 and 12 October 2014.

|}

Second round
The first legs were played on 18 and 19 October, and the second legs were played on 25 and 26 October 2014.

|}

Player of the year awards

Ever since 2003 the online bookmaker Unibet have given out awards at the end of the season to the best players in Division 2. The recipients are decided by a jury of sportsjournalists, coaches and football experts. The names highlighted in green won the overall national award.

References

Swedish Football Division 2 seasons
4
Sweden
Sweden